The Fillmore House, or Millard Fillmore House, is a historic house museum at 24 Shearer Avenue in East Aurora in Erie County, New York.  Built in 1826, it was from then until 1830 the residence of the 13th president of the United States, Millard Fillmore.  Moved twice and significantly altered, it is the only surviving building other than the White House associated with Fillmore's life.  It was designated a National Historic Landmark in 1974.  The house is owned by the Aurora Historical Society and has been decorated with period furnishings.  As of 2022, it is open for tours by reservation only.

Description and history
The Fillmore House stands on the east side of Shearer Avenue north of Main Street, west of the village center of East Aurora.  It is a -story wood-frame structure, with a gabled roof and clapboarded exterior. A shed-roof porch with round columns extends across the three-bay front facade.  A brick chimney rises on the right side, and a series of single-story ells, not original to the building, extend to the rear.  The building is not architecturally distinguished.

Millard Fillmore built this house in 1826 on a property on Main Street.  Fillmore had just married, and established a law practice with an office (no longer extant) across the road.  Fillmore's son was born in this house before the Fillmores moved to Buffalo in 1830.  After the Fillmore occupancy, the building had multiple owners and multiple additions made to it.  In 1915, it was moved further back on its original lot to make room for a theater.  At that site it was abandoned and fell into decay until 1930, when it was rescued by Margaret and Irving Price.  They moved the original core of the building to its current location and oversaw its restoration for use as a home at artist studio for Margaret.  It was acquired by the Aurora Historical Society in 1975, and restored in appearance to the period of Fillmore's ownership.

Gallery

See also
 List of residences of presidents of the United States
 Presidential memorials in the United States

References

External links

Aurora Historical Society
National Park Service site on Fillmore House
 "Millard Fillmore", by John T. Horton, Buffalo and Erie County Historical Society, Adventures in Western New York History, volume II, 1960, (downloadable from http://bechsed.nylearns.org/, click on Adventures in WNY History)
"Life Portrait of Millard Fillmore", from C-SPAN's American Presidents: Life Portraits, broadcast from Fillmore House, June 11, 1999

National Historic Landmarks in New York (state)
Houses on the National Register of Historic Places in New York (state)
Presidential homes in the United States
Museums in Erie County, New York
Houses completed in 1826
Historic house museums in New York (state)
Fillmore family
Presidential museums in New York (state)
Houses in Erie County, New York
Millard Fillmore
1826 establishments in New York (state)
National Register of Historic Places in Erie County, New York